The National Center of Polar Research is a specialized body established by the Sofia University "St. Kliment Ohridski, working together with Bulgarian Antarctic Institute in 2008 to appropriate the state budget funds allocated to polar scientific exploration, granted through the Ministry of Education and Science and Ministry of Environment and Waters of Bulgaria.

See also
 Bulgarian Antarctic Institute
 Antarctic Place-names Commission

References
 Decision by the Academic Council of Sofia University on the establishment of the National Center of Polar Research (in Bulgarian)

Research institutes in Bulgaria
Sofia University